Avtandil Jorbenadze is a former State Minister of Georgia.

Before entering politics, Jorbenadze worked as a doctor; in this capacity, in 1992 he was called to take up the post of deputy minister of health.  He left the cabinet briefly the following year, but soon rejoined it as health minister. In 1999, he was given the responsibility for social security, and the next year that for labour. When President Shevardnadze dismissed his cabinet, in the aftermath of a controversial storming of a television station by security agents, Jorbenadze was appointed head of the cabinet in December 2001. He resigned his position during the November 2003 Rose Revolution. In 2011, he became the chairman of the supervisory board for Chapidze Emergency Cardiology Center in Tbilisi.

References
East, R. and Thomas, R. (2003). Profiles of People in Power:The World's Government Leaders, page 190.  Routledge. , 9781857431261.

Notes

Government ministers of Georgia (country)
KGB officers
1951 births
Living people
20th-century politicians from Georgia (country)
21st-century politicians from Georgia (country)